象棋 may refer to:
 Xiangqi or Chinese chess
 Shogi or Japanese chess
 Janggi or Korean chess
 Shatar or Mongolian chess
 Makruk or Thai chess
 Sittuyin or Burmese chess

See also
Chinese chess (disambiguation)